Sara Errani and Roberta Vinci were the defending champions, but Errani chose not to participate this year. Vinci played alongside Karin Knapp, but lost in the third round to Casey Dellacqua and Yaroslava Shvedova.

Top seeds Martina Hingis and Sania Mirza won the title, defeating Ekaterina Makarova and Elena Vesnina 5–7, 7–6(7–4), 7–5 in the final. Mirza became the first ever Indian to win a women's doubles major; while Hingis won her 10th title in the category and her first since the 2002 Australian Open.

Seeds

Qualifying

Draw

Finals

Top half

Section 1

Section 2

Bottom half

Section 3

Section 4

References 
 Main draw
2015 Wimbledon Championships – Women's draws and results at the International Tennis Federation

Women's Doubles
Wimbledon Championship by year – Women's doubles
2015 in women's tennis